The Museum of Possibilities, is a museum for the people with disabilities located in Chennai, Tamil Nadu. It is an initiative by the Department of Welfare of Differently Abled Persons of Government of Tamil Nadu. It showcases accessible devices, assistive technologies and model accessible home.

References 

Museums in India
Disability in India